The Aurealis Awards are presented annually by the Australia-based Chimaera Publications and WASFF to published works in order to "recognise the achievements of Australian science fiction, fantasy, horror writers". To qualify, a work must have been first published by an Australian citizen or permanent resident between 1 January and 31 December of the corresponding year; the presentation ceremony is held the following year. It has grown from a small function of around 20 people to a two-day event attended by over 200 people.

Since their creation in 1995, awards have been given in various categories of speculative fiction. Categories currently include science fiction, fantasy, horror, speculative young adult fiction—with separate awards for novels and short fiction—collections, anthologies, illustrative works or graphic novels, children's books, and an award for excellence in speculative fiction. The awards have attracted the attention of publishers by setting down a benchmark in science fiction and fantasy. The continued sponsorship by publishers such as HarperCollins and Orbit has identified the award as an honour to be taken seriously.

The results are decided by a panel of judges from a list of submitted nominees; the long-list of nominees is reduced to a short-list of finalists. Ties can occur if the panel decides both entries show equal merit, however they are encouraged to choose a single winner. The judges may declare a "no award" if there is unanimous agreement that none of the nominees are worthy. The judges are selected from a public application process by the Award's management team.

This article lists all the short-list nominees and winners in the best children's fiction category which replaces the following two previous categories for children's fiction:
 Aurealis Award for best children's fiction (told primarily through words)
 Aurealis Award for best children's fiction (told primarily through pictures)

In 2013, this award was known as the Aurealis Award for best children's book.

Winners and nominees
In the following table, the years correspond to the year of the work's eligibility; the ceremonies are always held the following year. Each year links to the corresponding "year in literature" article. Entries with a blue background have won the award; those with a white background are the nominees on the short-list. If the work was originally published in a book with other stories rather than by itself or in a magazine, the book title is included after the publisher's name.

As of the 2021 awards, which were presented in May 2022, the following have received the most nominations:

 Lian Tanner (4)
 Bren MacDibble (3)
 Emily Rodda (3)
 Angelica Banks (2)
 Karen Foxlee (2)
 Rebecca Lim (2)
 Meg McKinlay (2)
 Jaclyn Moriarty (2)

 Winners and joint winners
 Nominees on the shortlist

References

External links
 Aurealis Awards official site

Aurealis Awards
Australian children's literary awards